The Established Programs Financing (EPF) was a financing program created by the Trudeau government in 1977, to finance the provincially-run healthcare and high-education system, through transfer payments, by cash and tax points.

The 1995 Canadian federal budget announced that both the Established Programs Financing and the Canada Assistance Plan would be combined into a new block-fund fiscal arrangement called the Canada Health and Social Transfer starting in 1996–97 fiscal year.

History
The first agreement on Established Programs Financing was reached in 1977 and set to expired in 1987. It stipulated that increases in the program were tied to the growth in the national economy.

The agreement was legislated through the Federal-Provincial Fiscal Arrangements and Established Programs Financing Act, 1977 which received royal assent on 31 March 1977.

The EPF was subjected to multiple rounds of cuts since the mid 1980s, under both Liberal and Progressive-Conservative governments. Starting on 1 April 1983, EPF growth was restricted to the lower of GDP growth and a maximum escalator rate of 6%. That rate was further lowered to 5% starting on 1 April 1984.

In the 1985 federal budget, Finance Minister Michael Wilson announced a plan to limit the rate of the growth of EPF to save $2 billion by fiscal year 1990–91. The savings are achieved by modifying the escalation clause: for fiscal years 1986–87 through 1989–90 the maximum escalator rate is repealed but the escalation only considers GDP growth above 2%. EPF growth rate was further reduced by 1% in the 1989 budget resulting in additional savings of $200 million in 1990–91.

The 1990 budget froze EPF per-capita entitlements through fiscal year 1991–92, a measure implemented by the Government Expenditure Restraint Act that received royal assent on 1 January 1991. A few weeks later Wilson announced in the 1991 budget that EPF entitlements would be frozen through fiscal year 1994–95 and would then resume growth based on GDP per capital growth minus 3%. The measure was implemented by the Budget Implementation Act, 1991 which received royal assent on 17 December 1991.

Notes and references

Notes

References

Related links 
 Territorial Formula Financing

1977 in Canada
Government finances in Canada
Healthcare in Canada